Jet Aviation is a Basel-based provider of business aviation services. Founded in Switzerland in 1967, it provides aircraft sales, maintenance, and charters using its fleet of more than 200 aircraft. Since 2008, Jet Aviation has been a subsidiary of General Dynamics and employs approximately 4,000 staff across Europe, Asia, and the Americas.

History
The late Carl W. Hirschmann established Jet Aviation in 1967 as a maintenance organization when he bought the former Globe Air hangars in Basel, Switzerland, and opened the first maintenance facility for business aircraft in Europe.

Two years later, he expanded the company and entered a new line of business by acquiring the Pilatus maintenance and airline handling operations in Zürich and Geneva. He also began offering aircraft charter and management services to European and Middle Eastern customers.

The 1970s
During the 1970s, the company expanded its offering to the European and Middle Eastern markets, including charters and aircraft management, establishing its first overseas maintenance facility in Düsseldorf in 1975. Two years later, the company introduced outfitting at its Basel facility. In 1979, it began FBO operations in Jeddah, Saudi Arabia.

The 1980s
1980s brought further expansion to the company in Europe and the Middle East. More importantly, Jet Aviation successfully entered the U.S. market to become the first global player in the business aviation industry. Since the mid-'80s, the company bought existing FBOs in Boston/Bedford, Massachusetts and Palm Beach, Florida. In 1988, the company added an FBO in Teterboro, New Jersey to serve the strategically important New York City corporate marketplace. The same year, Jet Aviation acquired Teterboro-based Executive Air Fleet - the largest aircraft management and charter company in North America.

The 1990s
Jet Aviation, Basel, and the three U.S. FBOs in Boston/Bedford, Palm Beach and Teterboro were expanded to enhance these facilities' overall quality and services. In 1994, Jet Aviation was granted the right to expand its airline handling services in Zurich and Geneva to provide services to scheduled airlines and IATA carriers. A major move into the Asian market was opening a maintenance and FBO facility in Singapore in 1995. Two more locations, including a maintenance facility in Hannover, Germany, and a full-service FBO operation in 1999 at Love Field in Dallas, Texas were added to Jet Aviation's global network.

The 2000s
In October 2005 Jet Aviation was acquired by the Permira Funds, which marked the end of 38 years of family entrepreneurship. Under new ownership, in March 2006, the company announced its acquisition of St. Louis-based Midcoast Aviation, one of the leading maintenance, repair and overhaul, modifications and completions companies in North America. After almost 40 years as part of the group, Jet Aviation sold its airline and cargo handling division in Switzerland on November 6, 2007 to Dnata, the largest supplier of air travel services in the Middle East. Since December 2007 Jet Aviation has also provided line maintenance, defect rectification, and AOG services at Moscow's Vnukovo International Airport. 

In January 2008, Jet Aviation acquired U.S.-based maintenance and completions company Savannah Air Center located at the Savannah/Hilton Head International Airport. In Spring 2008, Jet Aviation and Beijing-based Deer Air, signed a joint venture to operate an FBO and line maintenance facility at Beijing's Capital International Airport.

On November 5, 2008, the company was acquired by U.S. based General Dynamics, headquartered in Falls Church, Virginia. As part of General Dynamics, Jet Aviation operates as an independent business unit within the General Dynamics Aerospace Group.

Business Jets   
Established in 2002, Business Jets Limited is a branch of Jet Aviation operating in the Hong Kong area. Based at Hong Kong International Airport, it provides chartered passenger services using its fleet of one Bombardier BD-700 and two Gulfstream G550 aircraft.

Jet Aviation Malta

References

External links 
Jet Aviation

General Dynamics
General aviation
Airlines of Switzerland
Airlines established in 1967
Swiss companies established in 1967
2008 mergers and acquisitions
Companies based in Basel